Architecture and Modernity: A Critique is a 1999 architecture book by the architectural theoretician and historian Hilde Heynen.

Starting from the first decades of the 20th century, Heynen attempts to examine the relationship between critical theory and modern architecture. The book traces two main strains, one from critical theory introduced by The Frankfurt School and philosophers such as Walter Benjamin, Theodor Adorno, Ernst Bloch, Max Horkheimer, and the other modern architecture originally put forth in Frankfurt by work of architects such as Adolf Loos, Ernst May, Hannes Meyer and historians such as Sigfried Giedion, Bruno Zevi, etc.

Architecture and Modernity, besides attempting to bridge the gap between architectural Theory and the discourse of critical theory, presents a clear history of modernism in architecture, exploring the works of avantgardes such as Constant Nieuwenhuys, Situationist International, Manfredo Tafuri, Max Bill, Guy Debord, Massimo Cacciari, and Francesco Dal Co.

Hilde Heynen`s book is consisting of four chapters:  "Architecture Facing Modernity", "Constructing the Modern Movement", "Reflections in a Mirror", and "Architecture as Critique of Modernity. The first chapter discusses the concepts of modernity and draws up the question “how does architecture relate to modernity”, which is answered in later chapters. The second chapter examines the works of Sigfried Giedion and Ernst May as cases for practical architecture that challenged modernity by adding elements of the avant-garde art and literature while adhering to traditional architectural values such as harmony and persistence.

Saummary 
The book consists of four chapters:
 Architecture Facing Modernity 
 Constructing the Modern Movement
 Reflections in a Mirror
 Architecture as Critique of Modernity

and in afterward it discusses on concepts of Dwelling, Mimesis, and Culture.

Criticism 
Professor of Architectural Theory at Harvard University, K. Michael Hays pointed out on this book:

References

Architecture books
Modernism
MIT Press books
1999 non-fiction books